Lemonia balcanica is a species of moth of the family Brahmaeidae (older classifications placed it in Lemoniidae). It is found in the Balkans.

The moth flies from September to October depending on the location.

The larvae feed on Taraxacum, Leontodon and Hieracium species.

Subspecies
Lemonia balcanica anatolica Wagner, 1931
Lemonia balcanica balcanica
Lemonia balcanica bremeri (Koleanti, 1846)
Lemonia balcanica cis Zolotuhin, 1994
Lemonia balcanica vashlovani Didmanidze, 1980

Sources
 P.C.-Rougeot, P. Viette (1978). Guide des papillons nocturnes d'Europe et d'Afrique du Nord. Delachaux et Niestlé (Lausanne).

References

External links

Lemonia balcanica up insecta.pro
Lepiforum.de

Brahmaeidae
Moths described in 1843
Moths of Europe
Moths of Asia
Taxa named by Gottlieb August Wilhelm Herrich-Schäffer